Chandra Singh is a former Fijian  politician of Indian descent, who was one of the eight nominees of the Leader of the Opposition to the Senate of Fiji after the 2006 elections.

References 

Fiji Labour Party politicians
Indian members of the Senate (Fiji)
Living people
Year of birth missing (living people)
Place of birth missing (living people)